Statistics of Bulgarian Republic Football Championship in the 1948 season.

Overview
It was contested by 16 teams, and Septemvri pri CDV Sofia won the championship.

First round

|}

Quarter-finals

|}

Semi-finals

|}

Final

First game

Second game

Septemvri pri CDV Sofia won 4–3 on aggregate.

References
Bulgaria - List of final tables (RSSSF)

Bulgarian Republic Football Championship seasons
1
1